Thelka Popov ( - 1883) was a nineteenth century Hungarian poisoner.  She aided and abetted in the poisoning of more than 100 men.

References

1810s births
1883 deaths
Hungarian female murderers
Hungarian female serial killers
Poisoners
Violence against men in Europe